Pic Me (or PICME) is an Irish animated children's television series which originally aired on RTÉ, later airing on TG4 and Nick Jr. channels throughout Europe.HIT Entertainment held worldwide distribution rights. Since mid-2008, episodes of Pic Me have aired in the United States on Animania HD and Sprout. Also, in the United States a Spanish-dubbed version airs on V-Me.

Format
Episodes of Pic Me last for approximately five to ten minutes. Pic Me is an innovative show in that it allows its viewers to star in each episode. Every episode has one viewer's photograph superimposed on a cartoon body. These characters then roam around the story, walking, running, jumping, and physically interacting with the main cartoon characters. The viewer characters never speak, and the other characters do not refer to them by name. Instead, they are referred to as "Little Boy" (if the avatar is male) or "Little Girl" (if the avatar is female) as is relevant.

Since the start of 2005, many new episodes of Pic Me have involved two viewers, instead of just one. These "best friends" type episodes have the main star viewer holding, or looking at, a picture of their real-life "best friend". Another episode starring the "best friend" is shown at a later date, with the situation regarding the pictures reversed.

Characters
The main characters in Pic Me include
Juno – a male lion with a nasal voice. He is generally insecure and often seen to be frightened of confrontation. He is very forgetful, but loves having fun with his friends.
Gerty – a female giraffe. She is quite intelligent and loves to cook, but is very fussy and likes things to be clean.
Banjo – a male purple monkey.
Umi – a red, female parrot. She is clever and fun-loving, but can have a brash attitude towards other characters, although not the "Little Boy" or "Little Girl". She is very talkative, but friendly. She enjoys carrying her friends into the air to "look at the sky". Presumably they enjoy this.
Clarence – a male crocodile who has an inferiority complex. He is proud of his ability to swim, but otherwise can get very nervous around other characters.
Neville – a blue, male elephant. He is the most intelligent character and is the character who gives everyone else good advice. They all ask him questions and – after screwing up his eyes – he will eventually give the right answer. He is a moral character and teaches the others right from wrong.

The goal of the show is to help teach children. The viewers learn lessons from the differences between right and wrong (not telling lies etc.) to learning shapes, colours and counting.

DVD releases
A DVD release of the series titled: "Pic Me: You're the Star!" was released by HIT Entertainment in the United Kingdom on 23 October 2006. It contained twelve episodes of the show in its original widescreen format, alongside a bonus CD-ROM containing Microsoft Windows software to create your own Pic Me cartoons. A similar DVD - titled "Pic Me: Personalised Early Learning", was released in Ireland by RTE, however, the episodes featured were shown in a cropped fullscreen ratio.

The episode "Journey into Space" was included as a bonus episode on several HIT Entertainment DVDs in the United Kingdom in January 2007, such as "Incredibubble Children's Favourites", Angelina Ballerina - Angelina Sets Sail, and Fireman Sam on Stage.

Awards
 Best digital storytelling category (2005 Digital Media Awards)
 Best Youth Programme (2005 Irish Film and Television Awards)

References

2004 Irish television series debuts
2007 Irish television series endings
Irish flash animated television series
Irish preschool education television series
Television series with live action and animation
Animated television series about birds
Animated television series about children
Animated television series about elephants
Animated television series about lions
Animated television series about monkeys
Fictional crocodilians
Fictional giraffes
Animated preschool education television series
Television series by Mattel Creations
2000s preschool education television series
English-language television shows